Felida is a census-designated place (CDP) in Clark County, Washington, United States. The population was 9,526 at the 2020 census.

A post office called Felida was established in 1890, and remained in operation until 1906. The community derives its name from Felidae, the family of cats.

Geography
Felida is located in southwestern Clark County at  (45.709848, -122.705373).

Demographics
As of the census of 2000, there were 5,683 people, 1,877 households, and 1,640 families residing in the CDP. The population density was 1,967.8 people per square mile (759.2/km2). There were 1,959 housing units at an average density of 678.3/sq mi (261.7/km2). The racial makeup of the CDP was 92.13% White, 1.23% African American, 0.58% Native American, 2.96% Asian, 0.04% Pacific Islander, 0.70% from other races, and 2.36% from two or more races. Hispanic or Latino of any race were 2.59% of the population. 21.4% were of German, 13.4% English, 10.3% Irish, 7.7% American and 5.2% Norwegian ancestry according to Census 2000.

There were 1,877 households, out of which 46.7% had children under the age of 18 living with them, 79.3% were married couples living together, 6.1% had a female householder with no husband present, and 12.6% were non-families. 9.1% of all households were made up of individuals, and 3.2% had someone living alone who was 65 years of age or older. The average household size was 3.03 and the average family size was 3.22.

In the CDP, the age distribution of the population shows 31.3% under the age of 18, 4.9% from 18 to 24, 29.0% from 25 to 44, 27.6% from 45 to 64, and 7.1% who were 65 years of age or older. The median age was 38 years. For every 100 females, there were 99.1 males. For every 100 females age 18 and over, there were 95.6 males.

The median income for a household in the CDP was $78,934, and the median income for a family was $80,264. Males had a median income of $59,125 versus $35,943 for females. The per capita income for the CDP was $28,294. About 2.9% of families and 3.4% of the population were below the poverty line, including 5.5% of those under age 18 and none of those age 65 or over.

References

Census-designated places in Clark County, Washington
Census-designated places in Washington (state)